Alia Hogben is the previous Executive Director of the Canadian Council of Muslim Women. Hogben has been involved with the Canadian Council of Muslim Women since its founding, initially serving as a board member.

Education and early career 
The daughter of a diplomat, Alia Hogben was born in Burma but spent her youth in India and in several other countries.  Her family eventually moved to Canada, where she settled permanently. She earned a Bachelor of Arts degree at Carleton University in Ottawa, and a master's degree in Social Work at the University of Toronto. She went on to pursue a professional career in social work and worked in direct services as well as with the Ontario government supervising various social service agencies in South East Ontario. Alia has also worked in services for children and women who have been abused, and services for adults with developmental disabilities.

Awards and honors 
In 2012, Hogben became the second Canadian Muslim woman to be awarded the Order of Canada for her work in the area of women's rights. The award citation recognized her for being “an articulate spokesperson for the humane, tolerant and equality-based interpretation of Islam and for interfaith dialogue.” A year earlier, she was awarded an honorary doctorate by Queen's University, in Kingston, Ontario, on the recommendation of the Queen's School of Religion. In 2014, Maclean's Magazine ranked Hogben 24th of the 50 "Most Powerful List" of people in Canada.

References 

Year of birth missing (living people)
Living people
Members of the Order of Canada
Canadian social workers